The Tachikawa Ki-54 was a Japanese twin-engine advanced trainer used during World War II. The aircraft was named Hickory by the Allies.

History
The Ki-54 was developed in response to an Imperial Japanese Army requirement for a twin-engine advanced trainer, principally for crew training. The prototype first flew in summer 1940 and, on completing trials, entered production in 1941 as Army Type 1 Advanced Trainer Model A (Ki-54a). The Ki-54a was soon followed by the Ki-54b as Army Type 1 Operations Trainer Model B and Ki-54c as Army Type 1 Transport Model C. The Ki-54b and -c enjoyed successful careers until the end of the war. A few captured aircraft were flown after the war by various users.

Operators

 Imperial Japanese Army Air Force used them for training as per their design.

 Manchukuo Air Force Three were provided by Japan as VIP transports.
 China-Nanjing
 Nanjing air force

 Republic of China Air Force Nationalist Chinese (captured).

 People's Liberation Army Air Force Communist Chinese (captured): Four captured Ki-54s were used, including in 1951 to train the first class of female pilots in China. They were retired in 1952.

 Armée de l'Air At least seven Ki-54 were recovered by the French in French Indochina between 1945 and 1947, after the Japanese surrender.

 One aircraft operated briefly by No. 273 Squadron RAF during September and October 1945 in French Indochina.

Variants
 Ki-54a - unarmed pilot trainer
 Ki-54b - armed crew trainer
 Ki-54c - eight-passenger light transport, communications aircraft. Civil designation Y-59.
 Ki-54d - maritime reconnaissance/ASW, carried 8x 60-kg (132-lb) depth charges
 Ki-110 - one prototype Ki-54c of all-wood construction, destroyed in US bombing attack
 Ki-111 - projected fuel tanker (none built)
 Ki-114 - projected fuel tanker of all-wood construction (none built)

Surviving aircraft

A Ki-54 fuselage is in Australia in storage at the Australian War Museum Annex. It was previously part of a playground at the RAAF Fairbairn base kindergarten.
Another Ki-54 fuselage is stored in China at the Chinese Aviation Museum.
An unrestored Ki-54 is on display at the Misawa Aviation & Science Museum, Japan, it was found at the bottom of Lake Towada in Aomori Prefecture on 13 August 2010. It was recovered on 5 September 2012 and has been restored for display.

Specifications (Ki-54c light transport)

See also

References

Notes

Bibliography
  (new edition 1987 by Putnam Aeronautical Books, .)
 

Ki-54
Ki-54, Kawasaki
Low-wing aircraft
Aircraft first flown in 1940
Twin piston-engined tractor aircraft